Bali Nagar is a medium-high dem residential colony located in West of New Delhi, India. It was developed by Bali & Co (Pvt) Ltd. Once a farming land, it was sold for development in the 1970s and was primarily bought up by businessmen. It is a relatively green ex-suburb with a spacious high street boasting most amenities. Please click on link provided to check the latest Rating & Review on Bali Nagar:

Geography
Bali Nagar shares a very strategic location with an easy access to and from Rajouri Garden malls (to the West), Kirti Nagar (to the South East), Moti Nagar (to the East), Shivaji Enclave (North Western neighbour), Ramesh Nagar (Southern neighbour), Raja Garden (Western neighbour), Basai Dara Pur (Eastern neighbour), West Punjabi Bagh (Northern neighbour), West Delhi Universities (Rajdhani / Shivaji College), and ESI Hospital on Ring Road, all located either a walking distance or a few minutes drive or Metro away. The location is highly approachable as it is under 11 km, which takes approx. 25–30 minutes drive from main hubs like Dhaula Kuan, Central Delhi like Karol Bagh and Connaught Place and any other Delhi Hubs. However, with the introduction of Delhi Metro the distances have been cut almost in half. The Indira Gandhi International Airport is 12.6 km away and can be reached in 25-35 mins, and the same goes for the Railway station!

History
Bali Nagar was developed by a real estate company known as Bali & Co (Pvt) Ltd. The vast collection of farming lands was opened up to development in Delhi's 1970s expansion to the north and west. Many of the new residents were Punjabis who had migrated from Punjab and Haryana. Over the years, new families and communities have moved into the area, but it still remains a largely Punjabi-dominated area.

Notable personalities include Kichu and Mage Magellan.

Facilities
Bali Nagar offers hassle-free free parking on an 80-foot road. This government approved commercial market offers a variety of facilities such as a Hindu temple, Gurudwara Sahib, community hall, major banks and financial institutions such as HDFC Bank, Axis Bank, HDB Finance, Indian Overseas Bank, State Bank of Patiala, and Muthoot Finance along with some independent companies/offices. For food shopping there are supermarkets such as Reliance Fresh,  Mother Dairy, and Flour Mill along with other independent grocers and food stores. It also boasts major business and brand presence such as LML World Showroom, Semiens, LG, Samsung, Vodafone, Hyundai Car Parts, Airtel, Exide, Bharat Music House, book publishing houses, and wine & beer shops. For eating out, there is a bar and some medium- to low-key restaurants which offer menus from typical Punjabi cuisine to Chinese/Muglai/Halwai sweets and snacks. From a medical point of view there are a few chemists, dental clinics, and several Doctors GP (general practitioner) clinics. There is also a hospital and a nursing home on the high street. Bali Nagar has a number of lush green and serene parks between the residential blocks. The main park offers a variety of activities and services such as yoga mornings, jogging/walking tracks, benches, and sections of kids' play areas. There are a variety of primary schools in and around Bali Nagar. The popular shopping district of Rajouri Garden (with its new malls) is about a ten-minute walk away. For transportation, Bali Nagar shares the Metro station with Ramesh Nagar. Ramesh Nagar Metro Station is sandwiched between Ramesh Nagar and the Southern edge of Bali Nagar on Najafgargh Road. There is also a convenient bus route with stands near both the North and South edges of Bali Nagar. There is also an auto rickshaw stand and cycle rickshaws that are easily available day and night.

References
Delhi and its Neighbourhood, Y.D. Sharma, the Archaeological Survey of India Press, 1982.
Bhardwaj, Abhishek, 2014. A guide to property in West Delhi. Investing in West Delhi Real Estate, 1, 1-110.
http://www.magicbricks.com/real-estate-property-reviews/Bali-Nagar-in-New-Delhi#reviewResult

Notes

New Delhi
Neighbourhoods in Delhi